Hwang Taek-eui (Hangul: 황택의; born  in Seoul) is a South Korean male volleyball player. He is part of the South Korea men's national volleyball team. On club level he plays for the Uijeongbu KB Insurance Stars.

Career
While attending Sungkyunkwan University in 2015, Hwang was called-up to the South Korean collegiate national team for the 2015 U23 World Championship where his team finished in eighth place.

Hwang decided to forgo his final two years of collegiate eligibility and declared for the 2016 V-League Draft. Hwang was selected first overall by the  Gumi LIG Greaters in the 2016 V-League Draft. Hwang was the first setter ever to be taken with the first overall pick in the V-League Draft.

After the 2016–17 V-League season, Hwang was named Rookie of the Year. In May 2017 Hwang was first selected for the South Korean senior national team to compete at the 2017 FIVB World League. He played as the starting setter in Team Korea's final game against Slovakia and led his team to a  3–2 victory, though he was mostly on the bench serving as the third-string setter behind Lee Min-gyu and No Jae-wook during the competition.

References

External links
 profile at FIVB.org

1996 births
Living people
South Korean men's volleyball players
21st-century South Korean people